Anime on Demand was a German video on demand service that specialised in the streaming of anime within German-speaking markets. Before the service's closure on 8 December 2021, Anime on Demand was owned by the Crunchyroll EMEA division of Crunchyroll, a subsidiary of Funimation.

History
Anime on Demand was founded in 2007 by anime distributor AV Visionen as a subsidiary, and was the first legal anime streaming service in German-speaking countries. Following the acquisition of AV Visionen by Viz Media Europe in 2009, Anime on Demand was merged into AV Visionen as a division, dissolving Anime on Demand GmbH.

In April 2011, Viz Media Europe subsidiary Kazé launched the Anime on Demand in the United Kingdom and Ireland, in collaboration with British anime distributors Manga Entertainment, Beez Entertainment and MVM Entertainment. Initially hosted by Anime News Network, Version 1.0 of the site, hosted by Viz Media Europe, launched as an open beta in December 2011.

In December 2013, Anime on Demand announced it was closing operations in the United Kingdom and Ireland, and was to be incorporated into Animax UK.

In September 2021, it was announced that Anime on Demand would be shutting down on 8 December 2021, with all content being merged into Crunchyroll.

Anime streamed in UK 
 A Dark Rabbit Has Seven Lives
 [C]
 Dantalian
 Deadman Wonderland
 Future Diary
 Lagrange: The Flower of Rin-ne
 Maken-ki!
 Maoyu
 My Teen Romantic Comedy SNAFU
 Nichijou
 Nura: Rise of the Yokai Clan
 R-15
 Persona 4: The Animation
 Sekai-ichi Hatsukoi
 Steins;Gate
 Tiger & Bunny
 Twin Angel: Twinkle Paradise
 Un-Go
 Usagi Drop

See also
Crunchyroll, an international anime streaming website.
Wakanim

References

External links
Official website

Crunchyroll
Funimation
Viz Media
Sony
Anime industry
Anime and manga websites
Companies based in Berlin
Internet properties established in 2007
Internet properties disestablished in 2021
Streaming television